Sy is a commune in the Ardennes department in northern France.

Population

See also
 List of short place names
Communes of the Ardennes department

References

Communes of Ardennes (department)
Ardennes communes articles needing translation from French Wikipedia